Minko Minchev (1925 – 1996) was a Bulgarian footballer. He played in three matches for the Bulgaria national football team from 1948 to 1950. He was also part of Bulgaria's squad for the 1952 Summer Olympics, but he did not play in any matches.

References

External links
 
 

1925 births
1996 deaths
Bulgarian footballers
Bulgaria international footballers
Place of birth missing
Association football goalkeepers
PFC Slavia Sofia players